Igor Alekseyevich Kashkarov (born 5 May 1933) is a former Soviet athlete who competed mainly in the High Jump. He trained at Burevestnik in Moscow.

He competed for the USSR in the 1956 Summer Olympics held in Melbourne, Australia in the high jump where he won the bronze medal.

References

 Sports Reference

1933 births
Living people
Soviet male high jumpers
Russian male high jumpers
Olympic bronze medalists for the Soviet Union
Athletes (track and field) at the 1956 Summer Olympics
Olympic athletes of the Soviet Union
Burevestnik (sports society) athletes
Medalists at the 1956 Summer Olympics
Olympic bronze medalists in athletics (track and field)
Universiade medalists in athletics (track and field)
Universiade silver medalists for the Soviet Union
Medalists at the 1961 Summer Universiade